Northup is a surname and may refer to:
 Amos Northup (1889–1937), American automotive designer
 Anne Northup (born 1948), American politician
 Diana Northup, American biologist
 James M. Northup (1820–1899), New York politician
 Jeremiah Northup (1816–1879), Canadian merchant, shipowner, and politician
 Jeremiah Northup (Nova Scotia politician) (died 1809), Nova Scotia politician
 Harry Northup (born 1940), American actor and poet
 Nancy Northup (born 1960), American political activist
 Nate Northup (born 1981), American soccer player
 Oliver Northup (1925–2013), American murder victim
 Solomon Northup (1808–1863), American farmer, violinist and author
 Stephen Northup (circa 1630 – after 1687), early settler of the Colony of Rhode Island and Providence Plantations
 Willard C. Northup (1882–1942), American architect

See also
 Anson Northup, a sternwheel riverboat named for her captain
 Northup, Ohio, an unincorporated community in Gallia County, Ohio, United States
 Northup Trail, a Louisiana Scenic Byway